The Diocese of Constantina (Latin: Constantiniensis) is a sede vacante titular diocese of the Catholic Church. When a territorial diocese, it was in the Roman province of Osrhoene, Mesopotamia (now Turkey), a suffragan diocese within the ecclesiastical province of the Archdiocese of Edessa.

Bishops

 Titular Bishop Francesco Sperelli - (13 Sep 1621 - 22 Jul 1631)
 Titular Bishop Daniel Vitus Nastoupil (Nastaupill, Hapstampsel) - (15 Dec 1664 Appointed - 21 Nov 1665 Died)
 Titular Bishop José Henrique Correa da Gama - (30 Jul 1727 - ?)
 Titular Bishop Giulio Mariano Carmelo Benzo - (23 Jun 1828 - 18 Nov 1856)
 Titular Bishop Edward Barron - (3 Oct 1842 - 2 Mar 1844)
 Titular Bishop Joseph Rabbani - (14 Dec 1947 - 24 Feb 1951)
 Titular Bishop Josef Hiltl - (28 Apr 1951 - 20 Apr 1979)

References

Titular sees in Asia
Mesopotamia
Former Roman Catholic dioceses in Asia